The New Zealand national cricket team toured Ceylon and Australia in October and November 1937 to play four matches, of which the three Australian matches are rated first-class. The New Zealand team was captained by Curly Page. They played the Ceylonese national team in Colombo and then three Australian state teams.

The New Zealand team were returning from their tour of England. The tour had not been financially successful, so the New Zealand Cricket Council hastily arranged the short tour of Australia in the hope of recouping their losses. The team was unchanged, except that Cyril Parsloe replaced Jack Dunning, who was unable to take any further time away from work.

Tour matches
First match

Second match

Third match

Fourth match

References

External links
 New Zealand in Australia, 1937-38 at Cricinfo
 New Zealand in Australia 1937-38 at CricketArchive

1937 in Australian cricket
1937 in New Zealand cricket
1937 in Ceylon
New Zealand cricket tours of Australia
New Zealand cricket tours of Sri Lanka
International cricket competitions from 1918–19 to 1945
Australian cricket seasons from 1918–19 to 1944–45
Sri Lankan cricket seasons from 1880–81 to 1971–72